The surname Heiden has a number of different spellings including Haydn, Heide, Heid, Heidling, Heideling, Heidt, Heyde. The toponym exists as Heiden in a number of places in Germany and Switzerland.

As a nickname, it comes from the Middle High German heiden meaning "Heathen". The Middle High German heiden in turn comes from the Old High German heidano, a derivative of heida, "heath". Many have taken the name Haydn as a given name, after the composer Joseph Haydn, whose name comes from the use of heiden as a nickname to mean "heathen".

As an Ashkenazi Jewish name it may be a shortened form of placenames with the compound Heide, such as Heidenberg. It may also be another use of the nickname Heida, meaning "heathen".

As a Dutch name it is a shortened version of the surname Vanderheyden.

People with the surname
 Anton Heiden (1960), former water polo player from The Netherlands
 Bernhard Heiden (1910–2000), German-American composer and music teacher
 Beth Heiden (born 1959), American athlete
 Erhard Heiden (1901–1933), an early member of the Nazi Party and the third commander of the Schutzstaffel (SS)
 Eric Heiden (born 1958), American speed skater
 Frederick Heiden (1821–1900) governor general of Finland
 Konrad Heiden (1901–1966), journalist and historian of Nazi Germany
 Ira Heiden (born 1966), American television and film actor
 Siem Heiden (1905–1993), Dutch speed skater 
 Sona Heiden, Indian film actress and model
 Steve Heiden (born 1976), American football player

References

German-language surnames